William Etchu Tabi (born November 13, 1982) is a Cameroonian former footballer who currently serves as the Skills Development coach for Burlington SC Academy, and head coach for Galaxy FC in the Canadian Academy of Soccer League.

Career
Etchu Tabi  started his career in his native land with Sable FC. In 2001, he went overseas to sign with Argentine giants  San Lorenzo. After one season in Turkey with Samsunspor, he traveled to Bosnia and Herzegovina to sign with NK Široki Brijeg.

Tabi would have a successful career in Bosnian and Herzegovina and Croatian football. Where he played in the top leagues for both countries. He played for several clubs from these countries most notable with NK Široki Brijeg, HŠK Zrinjski Mostar and HNK Šibenik. During his time with Siroki Brijeg he played in the 2005–06 UEFA Cup against FC Basel.

In 2012, he went overseas to Canada to sign with London City of the Canadian Soccer League. In 2013, he signed with expansion franchise Burlington SC as a player-coach.

International career  
He was also part of the Cameroon U-20 team at the 1999 FIFA World Youth Championship.

Managerial career 
In 2013, he functioned as a player-coach for Burlington SC in the Canadian Soccer League. He coached the club for three seasons, and qualified the team for the playoffs for two seasons reaching the quarterfinals each season. He is involved as coach with the Burlington SC Academy in the field of Skills Development. In 2019, he served as the head coach for Galaxy FC in the Canadian Academy of Soccer League.

References

External sources
 1HNL Stats at HRrepka.

1977 births
Living people
Cameroonian footballers
Cameroonian expatriate footballers
Cameroon international footballers
Canadian Soccer League (1998–present) players
Association football midfielders
Sable FC players
San Lorenzo de Almagro footballers
Argentine Primera División players
Cameroonian expatriate sportspeople in Argentina
Expatriate footballers in Argentina
Samsunspor footballers
Expatriate footballers in Turkey
Cameroonian expatriate sportspeople in Turkey
NK Široki Brijeg players
HŠK Posušje players
HNK Šibenik players
HŠK Zrinjski Mostar players
NK Croatia Sesvete players
Halton United players
Expatriate footballers in Bosnia and Herzegovina
Expatriate footballers in Croatia
Cameroonian expatriate sportspeople in Canada
Expatriate soccer players in Canada
Cameroonian expatriate sportspeople in Croatia
Cameroonian football managers
Cameroon under-20 international footballers
Cameroonian expatriate football managers
London City players
Canadian Soccer League (1998–present) managers
Elite One players
Süper Lig players
Premier League of Bosnia and Herzegovina players
Croatian Football League players